Telmatophilus typhae is a species of silken fungus beetle native to Europe.

References

External links 
  Images representing Telmatophilus at BOLD

Cryptophagidae
Beetles described in 1802
Beetles of Europe